Hetha Peak is a peak, situated  northeast of Mount Saga on the ridge bounding the west side of Newall Glacier, Asgard Range, McMurdo Dry Valleys. In association with the names from Norse mythology grouped in this range, named by the New Zealand Geographic Board in 1998 after Hetha, a mythological Norse earth goddess.

References

Mountains of the Asgard Range